George Washington Edmonds (February 22, 1864 – September 28, 1939) was a Republican member of the U.S. House of Representatives from Pennsylvania.

Biography
George W. Edmonds was born in Pottsville, Schuylkill County, Pennsylvania. He graduated from the Philadelphia College of Pharmacy in 1887 and practiced pharmacy for several years. He was also engaged in the coal business. He served as member of the common council of Philadelphia 1896-1902. He was elected to Congress as a Republican in 1912 and served as the Chairman of the House Committee on Claims.

He was an unsuccessful candidate for renomination in 1924 and entered the wholesale coal and lumber business. Later he was elected manager of the Port of Philadelphia Ocean Traffic Bureau in September 1927 and served until 1933. He was again elected to Congress in 1932 for one term. He then resumed the wholesale coal business in Philadelphia.

He died at Jefferson Hospital on September 28, 1939.

References

 

Philadelphia City Council members
1864 births
1939 deaths
Politicians from Pottsville, Pennsylvania
Republican Party members of the United States House of Representatives from Pennsylvania